The Patras Carnival, or Patrino karnavali, is the largest event of its kind in Greece. It has more than 180 years of history. The events begin on 17 January and last up to Clean Monday. The carnival of Patras is not a single event but a variety of events that includes balls, parades, hidden treasure hunt and the children's carnival amongst others. It climaxes in the last weekend of Carnival with the Saturday evening parade of carnival groups, the extravagant Sunday parade of floats and groups, and finally the ritual burning of the carnival king at the St. Nikolaos Street pier in the harbour of Patras. Its characteristics are spontaneity, improvisation, inspiration and volunteerism. In 2019, there were about 750.000 participants in the carnival

History

The starting event of the Patras Carnival in its modern-day form was a ball given in the residence of the merchant Mortis in 1829. French troops of general Maison stationed in the city after its liberation from the Turks were a major influence on the carnival bringing their own culture and traditions to the festivities. During the 19th century new arrivals from the newly joined heptanese, the islands in the Ionian sea that became part of Greece in 1864, were to also dramatically influence the nature of the festivities with tremendous vitality, creativity and a sense of fun that were part of their vibrant regional culture and music. Later on, and as a consequence of the prosperity of the city at the end of the 19th century, the carnival festivities take on a more regular nature. The geographical location of the town and the ever-increasing dominance of the port ensured constant communication with Italy and the rest of Western Europe. Their grand carnivals and the Venetian carnival in particular were especially influential in shaping the festivities, giving the carnival to this day its western characteristics. The first carnival floats appeared in the 1870s. At that time the floats were exclusively the creations of individuals. Only later did the Municipality of Patras undertake to construct a large number of them. In 1872, with contributions from the town's wealthy raisin merchants, the celebrated Apollon Theatre was built by Ernst Ziller in George square. Carnival dances were hosted there and they continue to be hosted to this day. George square is the central location in carnival celebrations and the Apollon theatre serves as a backdrop to most major carnival events that take part in the square making it emblematic not only of the carnival but of the town itself. In 1880, on Saint Anthony's day the first "ampoules" appeared. These were groups who were disguised and anonymously poked fun at friends and other people in the neighborhood. This custom has now disappeared. As the historian of the Patras Carnival Nikos Politis points out, beautiful carnivals were organized during the belle époque in the years 1900, 1907, 1909 with attendance for the first time of individuals from all social classes and origins. This period also gave birth to the egg-war custom. Wax eggs were made stuffed with confetti using specially designed machines which the carnivals threw from balconies. Although this custom has disappeared, it is considered to be the precursor of the chocolate war which still persists. Bars of chocolates are thrown by revelers on floats or amongst groups at parties.

The developments of the following decade were not favorable for the carnival; the continuous wars and conflicts (Balkan wars, World War I, Asia Minor campaign) sent the men to the front and brought economic crisis and desolation to the city. In the first post-war years the situation did not improve perceptibly. Only some scattered events testify the arrival of the carnival. Obvious exception constitutes the imposing and amazing carnivals of the years 1938 and 1939. Nevertheless, World War II and the consecutive Greek Civil War bring an obligatory interruption. At the beginning of the 1950s, the first hesitant thoughts for a resurgence of the carnival are expressed. The most pessimistic predict a failure: "nothing will be as before". However, the carnival is indeed reborn. The pioneer musical groups "Orpheus" and "Patraiki' Mantolinata", a mandolin ensemble, lead the effort. The Patras Carnival returns into the lives of the citizens of Patras but also all Greeks, particularly those that could afford to travel to Patras (mainly affluent Athenians) in order to participate in the carnival and to attend the famous Bourboulia balls. In the same period, the Greek cinema showed scenes of the carnival in its films. Other historic scenes can be seen in pre-war films. However, in the 1950s, the carnival came under attack as fanatic Christian and other misinformed moral organizations appear in Patras from other regions of Greece during the carnival in order to denounce orgies, moral corruption and a state of "Sodom and Gomorrah", but they are prevented from creating trouble by the police. These completely unfounded accusations are met with indifference or annoyance by the citizens of Patras and visitors of the carnival. It is characteristic that the local church does not sympathize with the troublemakers since it knows that the carnival is a completely innocent recreational event. Yet, in the same period, there were cases of censorship which were imposed on certain carnival creations which had upset the establishment with their satirical humor. In 1964 the year of king Paul's death the Carnival was once again canceled.

Under no circumstances could these events shade the magnificence of the carnival which had already acquired Pan-Hellenic recognition and attracted the attention of certain international media. In 1966 the carnival was reorganized. The journalist Nikos Mastorakis introduces the Hidden Treasure Hunt, a game in which 94 citizens of Patras and visitors take part with their cars to find a list of sometimes obscure objects. The first prize was won by a team led by a friend of the carnival from Thessalonica; his name was Alkis Steas and he presented the game starting from the following year. Thus, the late Staes became for decades the legendary presenter of the carnival, which was broadcast by ERT and was watched by all Greek TV viewers. The presenter's expressions such as "the Carnival city of Greece", when he referred to Patras and "be happy" and "keep dancing!" when he referred to the carnival groups, remain historical. In 1974 the modern phase of the carnival begins as the revelers are convinced to abandon their cars and parade on foot in the streets (until then only floats paraded). Since then each year the spectacle grew and the carnival has become enormous with thousands of revelers taking part in the parade as hundreds of thousands of visitors flock to Patras to witness the proceedings.

Organiser

The soul of the carnival are the tens of thousands of carnivalists, from Patras, visitors and friends of the Patras Carnival, people of every age group who participate spontaneously in the carnival events; the official events and the hundreds of unofficial events such as carnival balls, masqued balls and parties at home, in neighbourhoods, clubs, cafes and restaurants. In recent decades a large part of the organisation is consistently undertaken by the Municipality of Patras through the Municipal Organisation for Cultural Development of Patras which supervises the carnival workshop, a unique space in Greece in which the giant floats of the carnival King and his entourage are built along with other structures that decorate the town during the duration of the carnival season. The carnival receives funding from the Ministry of Culture and other institutions. The official support however has come to reinforce a time honoured tradition and does not create something from scratch as with carnival events in other Greek municipalities.

The Opening Ceremony
Irrespective of when the Triodion falls, the three-week period preceding the first Sunday of Lent, it is customary for the Carnival of Patras to start on the day of St. Anthony (17 January). A town crier appears on the streets of Patras; in recent years this has been a specially constructed float with music. The crier announces the opening with a satirical message and invites the town's residents to assemble that evening for the opening ceremony in George square. During a spectacular celebration with elements of surprise, as the programme is kept secret till the last moment, the start of the Patras Carnival is declared by the town's mayor from the first floor balcony of the Apollon theatre. The programme usually includes pantomimes and patters, dances, music and fireworks.

The Children's carnival

A spectacular take on the traditional baby rally which was first organised in 1968 by the Naturalist Association of Patras, the Children's Carnival is an event that is exclusive to the Patras carnival. It culminates with the major parade that takes place the week before the grand parade. On that day thousands of young carnivalists from Patras, Western Greece and beyond, from the age of zero upwards, parade through the streets of Patras with their mums and dads, teachers and supervisors dressed in bright costumes, in groups created by their nurseries, kindergartens, music schools, dance schools and others. Cheerleaders and young musicians in the municipality band accompany them. Over the years the Children's Carnival has gained its own momentum successfully competing with that of the grown ups. Music has been composed to accompany it, special competitions and games are organised and the municipality's carnival workshop creates special floats inspired by popular fairy tales. In the Ipsilon Alonion square a 'carnival town' is created. Giant and colourful carnival structures allow the children to play. Over 5000 children participate in a festival involving numerous game events and creative activities whose objective is to introduce the younger generation to the Carnival and to encourage their abilities in artistic expression related to aesthetic or satirical masquerading.

The Treasure Hunt Game
The groups that participate in the carnival are composed of either permanent carnival companions, groups of friends, colleagues or neighbours. They have a name as a group and a theme for their costumes. Depending on their carnival term, member's education, and the time they have available they choose whether they will participate in the treasure hunt games or the parades or both. These games comprise questions from subjects such as history, philosophy, mathematics, or from practical knowledge, exercises in navigation through hidden clues spread throughout the town, artistic competitions in painting, pantomimes, theatrical highlights or whatever else the organisers of the game can think of. The group's performance in various phases of the game is scored and so the big winner emerges. Several groups have offices and clubs for the duration of the carnival period and many organise parties and dances or public events on streets and in squares. Some participate in the parade with their own carnival float constructed to match the masquerade theme of the group. The number of participants in a group varies between 50 and 300 people, sometimes more.

The Saturday night parade
This is also called the "Nihterini Podarati" [Night Parade on foot]. In earlier years, only the Treasure Hunt groups could participate without their floats. However, the last few years every group is free to join. Night, bright lights, an overwhelming stream of people, colors and high spirits combine to create a spectacular scene.

The Grand Parade
This is the climax of the Patras Carnival. The parade begins around noon on the Sunday before Clean Monday with numerous satirical floats constructed by the municipality followed by an endless stream of groups, each one with an individual theme around which their costumes are designed. Despite the constant flow, due to the number of people participating which in recent years has reached between 35 and 40 thousand, the parade takes several hours to complete. It cuts through the town and is watched by thousands on the streets, on balconies, in the stands and throughout Greece in a televised coverage.

Closing ceremony
 
An extension of the traditional festivities based around the burning of the float of the Carnival King, with concerts, dances, a farewell to the carnival past, announcements about the carnival to come and countless fireworks. It takes place at the port on Sunday night and is also broadcast on TV.

Sources
 Νίκος Ε. Πολίτης, Το καρναβάλι της Πάτρας, Αχαϊκές Εκδόσεις, Πάτρα 1987. (In Greek)
 Νίκος Α. Στεφανόπουλος, Το... άγνωστο καρναβάλι της Πάτρας. Ιστορία και... ιστορίες, Τυπογραφείο-Γραφικές Τέχνες Σπ. Ανδριόπουλος - Ν. Γεωργόπουλος Ο.Ε., Πάτρα 2014. (In Greek)

External links
 Largest Carnival Dance. World Record 2019. Youtube.Com. 7 March 2019.

Carnival
Festivals in Greece
Carnivals in Greece
Tourist attractions in Patras
Events in Patras
January events